The following is a list of Sri Lankans by educational institutions in Sri Lanka and around the world.

Secondary


A
List of Ananda College alumni

D
List of Dharmapala Vidyalaya alumni
List of Dharmaraja College alumni

J
List of Jaffna Hindu College people

M
List of Mahinda College alumni
List of Maliyadeva College alumni

N
List of Nalanda College Colombo alumni

R
List of Royal College Colombo alumni

S
List of St. Anthony’s College, Kandy alumni
List of St Peter's College, Colombo alumni
List of St. Thomas' College alumni

T
List of Trinity College, Kandy alumni

Z
List of Zahira College, Colombo alumni

Tertiary


C
List of Ceylon University College people
List of University of Ceylon people
List of University of Colombo people

E
List of Eastern University of Sri Lanka people

J
List of University of Jaffna people

K
List of University of Kelaniya people

M
List of University of Moratuwa people

P
List of University of Peradeniya people